TV with TV's Jonathan Torrens was a Canadian comedic newsmagazine-styled television program that debuted on the TVtropolis network on October 9, 2009. The show features Jonathan Torrens of Trailer Park Boys and Street Cents fame "break(ing) down the complicated scope of television by dissecting the stars, formats and genres of today’s (television) broadcasts".

The show ended its run in 2011 at 65 episodes.

References

2009 Canadian television series debuts
Television series about television
2000s Canadian comedy television series
Television series by Corus Entertainment
2011 Canadian television series endings
2010s Canadian comedy television series